Frederick Calvert  (9 June 1806 – 6 June 1891) was a British Whig politician.

Early life and family
Born 1806, Calvert was the second son of British general Harry Calvert and Caroline (née Hammersley), and the younger brother Harry Verney, Buckingham MP. He was called to the Bar at Inner Temple in 1831, and later made a member of the Queen's Counsel. He married Lucy Caroline Herbert, daughter of Tory politician Edward Herbert and Lucy (née Graham) in 1865; they had no children.

He was educated at Christ Church, Oxford and Merton College, Oxford, where he was a president of the United Debating Society.

Political career
Calvert was elected Whig MP for Aylesbury at a by-election in 1850, caused by the death of George Nugent-Grenville. However, he was unseated just a few months into the role after a petition-led inquiry found evidence of treating and bribery.

During his life, Calvert was also a Deputy Lieutenant for Buckinghamshire.

References

External links
 

UK MPs 1847–1852
1806 births
1891 deaths
Whig (British political party) MPs for English constituencies
Alumni of Christ Church, Oxford
Alumni of Merton College, Oxford
Presidents of the Oxford Union
Deputy Lieutenants of Buckinghamshire
19th-century King's Counsel